The Mixed doubles event at the 2014 Commonwealth Games was held at the Scotstoun Sports Campus, Glasgow from 29 July to 3 August.

Rachael Grinham and David Palmer of Australia defeated Alison Waters and Peter Barker of England 11–8, 11–10 to win the gold medal.

Medalists

Seeds

Finals

Group stage

Pool A

Pool B

Pool C

Pool D

Pool E

Pool F

Pool G

Pool H

References

Squash at the 2014 Commonwealth Games